Qualea calantha is a species of plant in the Vochysiaceae family. It is endemic to Peru.

It is found in the Amazon Basin region of eastern Peru.

References

calantha
Endemic flora of Peru
Flora of the Amazon
Vulnerable plants
Taxonomy articles created by Polbot